WCG may refer to:

 World Cyber Games, an international e-sports event
 World Combat Games, a sports event
 Wide Color Gamut
 World Community Grid, for scientific research computing 
 Worldwide Church of God, renamed Grace Communion International in 2009
 WCG (firm), an advertising agency
 WCG (college), a group of UK colleges
 WCG (Wide DC electric goods), a classification of locomotives of India